Clarita is a 2019 Philippine horror film directed by Derick Cabrido and starring Jodi Sta. Maria. It was based on the alleged possession of Clarita Villanueva.

Cast
Jodi Sta. Maria as Clarita Villanueva
Ricky Davao as Fr. Salvador
Arron Villaflor as Fr. Benedicto
Nonie Buencamino as Mayor Arsenio Lacson

Production
Clarita is based on the story of the alleged possession of Clarita Villanueva in the 1950s. It was produced under Black Sheep Productions.  Director Derick Cabrido first learned about the story while he was still working with the GMA television series Kapuso Mo, Jessica Soho through newspaper clippings. He took an interest in the story which had garnered wide domestic and international attention at the time. He learned that various Catholic and other Christian groups came to resolve her case.

Cabrido leaned to director-writer Cenon Palomares to help adapt the story into a feature film. The production team largely had to rely to newspaper clippings since broadcast media in the Philippines in the 1950s was absent with the country still recovering from the aftermath of World War II. They were also not able to interview any heir of Villanueva for potential material for the film. They also tried acquiring rights to use footage of the alleged possession from the British Broadcasting Corp. (BBC), but the BBC declined.

The production team approached the Catholic Bishops' Conference of the Philippines to talk to priests who perform exorcisms as well as secured a transcript of Clarita's exorcism. However the team decided against using the material due to it being deemed too "personal" and failure to secure consent from the Catholic Church, and the parties directly involved.

Release
The film premiered in cinemas in the Philippines on June 12, 2019.

Reception
The film grossed  by June 27, 2019.

References

Horror films based on actual events
Films about exorcism
Films set in the 1950s
Filipino-language films
Philippine horror films